Xerogyra is a genus of small, air-breathing land snails, terrestrial pulmonate gastropod mollusks in the family Geomitridae. 

The genus is distributed in the Italian Peninsula. Xerogyra species were within the genus Candidula until a molecular phylogeny revealed the polyphyly of Candidula and, the genus Xerogyra Monterosato, 1892 was recovered.

Species 
Species within the genus Xeroplexa include:
 Xerogyra fiorii (Alzona & Alzona Bisacchi, 1938)
 Xerogyra grovesiana (Paulucci, 1881)
 Xerogyra spadae (Calcara, 1845)

References 

 Kobelt, W. (1892). Literaturbericht. Nachrichtsblatt der Deutschen Malakozoologischen Gesellschaft, 24 (7/8): 149-152. Frankfurt am Main 
 Bank, R. A. (2017). Classification of the Recent terrestrial Gastropoda of the World. Last update: July 16th, 2017

 
Gastropod genera